Eynabad (also Romanized as ‘Eynābād and Ainābād; also known as Eyn Abad Hajebloo) is a village in Sabzdasht Rural District, in the Central District of Kabudarahang County, Hamadan Province, Iran. At the 2006 census, its population was 436, in 98 families.

References 

Populated places in Kabudarahang County